George Davis House may refer to:

in Canada
 George Davis House (Toronto)

in the United States
George R. Davis House, Abilene, Texas, listed on the NRHP in Taylor County, Texas
George W. Davis House, Bastrop, Texas, listed on the NRHP in Bastrop County, Texas

See also
Davis House (disambiguation)